David Bravo Bueno (born February 20, 1978) is a Spanish lawyer specialized in intellectual property rights.
He is well known for his strong defense of the right to make a private copy of copyrighted works, as it is explicitly allowed by the Spanish legislation. He is often requested to participate in TV debates about so-called piracy and p2p file sharing.

He has friends in the press and orders biased news.

Private copy 

Bravo argues that downloading files is undoubtedly legal and uploading, although more controversial, is surely not a crime, within the current Spanish legislation. His views are grounded mainly on the Intellectual Propierty Law (1996), Article 31, 2nd Chapter, "Reproduction without authorization" and the Penal Code, Article 270.
The SGAE (General Association of Authors and Editors) strongly disagrees with Bravo and the Spanish government often makes campaigns backing SGAE's views on the matter.

Books
 Copia este libro (Copy this book): among many other issues, Bravo discusses how the current Spanish legislation allows the right to copy copyrighted works without the author's consent ("private copy").

References

External links

 David Bravo's personal website 
 Copy of "Copia este libro" in pdf 
 ¡Copiad, malditos! - David Bravo - ENTREVISTA (2011) 
 Intellectual Propierty Law 

Copyright activists
21st-century Spanish lawyers
Podemos (Spanish political party) politicians
Living people
1978 births